Sixx is a German free-to-air television channel specialised for women. It was launched on 7 May 2010 at 8:15pm.

Programming

German

Abenteuer Ferne
Alles außer Sex
 Anna und die Liebe
Besser Essen – leben leicht gemacht
Bis in die Spitzen, German version of Cutting It (2010)
Das Model und der Freak
Eine wie keine
Frank – der Weddingplaner
Germany's Next Topmodel
Hand aufs Herz
Jugendcoach Oliver Lück
Koffer zu und weg – Die Auswander-Doku
Look of Love
Schlüsselreiz
sixx in concert
Windeln und Wellness – Familienurlaub all inclusive
Zacherl: Einfach kochen!

Foreign

90210
Accidentally on Purpose (Aus Versehen glücklich) (2012-2013)
Alias (Alias - Die Agentin)
American Horror Story (2013-2014, 2016-2017)
Brothers & Sisters
Buffy the Vampire Slayer (Buffy – Im Bann der Dämonen) (2013-2017)
Cagney & Lacey (2012)
Charmed (Charmed – Zauberhafte Hexen)
Cougar Town
Damages (Damages – Im Netz der Macht)
Desperate Housewives
Devious Maids (Devious Maids - Schmutzige Geheimnisse) (2015–present)
Diagnosis: Murder (Diagnose: Mord) (2012-2014)
Drop Dead Diva
Ed (Ed – Der Bowling-Anwalt)
Eli Stone
ER (Emergency Room – Die Notaufnahme)
Emily Owens, M.D. (Emily Owens) (2013, 2017–present)
Extant (2015-2016)
Falcon Crest (2015)
Friends
Ghost Whisperer (Ghost Whisperer – Stimmen aus dem Jenseits)
Gossip Girl
Greek
Grey’s Anatomy
Hart of Dixie (2013-2014, 2016–present)
HawthoRNe
Homicide Hunter (Homicide Hunter - Dem Mörder auf der Spur) (2016–present)
Hope & Faith (2010)
JAG (JAG – Im Auftrag der Ehre)
Joan of Arcadia (Die himmlische Joan)
Joey (2011)
Kyle XY
Less than Perfect (Office Girl)
Life Is Wild
Life Unexpected (2011-2013, 2017–present)
Lipstick Jungle
Mad Love
Make It or Break It
Melrose Place
Medical Investigation
Medium (Medium – Nichts bleibt verborgen)
Miami Medical
Missing (Missing – Verzweifelt gesucht)
Moonlight (2011-2012, 2014-2015)
Mr. Sunshine (2013)
Necessary Roughness (Dr. Dani Santino – Spiel des Lebens)
Nip/Tuck (Nip/Tuck – Schönheit hat ihren Preis)
October Road
One Born Every Minute (US) (One Born Every Minute - Die Babystation) (2014)
One Tree Hill (2012-present)Pan Am (2013)Party of FivePolyamory: Married & Dating (Polyamorie - Liebe zu dritt) (2015-2016)Private PracticePrivilegedPushing DaisiesRescue MeS1ngle (2011-2011, 2013)Samantha Who?Scream Queens (2017)Second Time AroundSex and the CitySue Thomas: F.B.I.Surviving Evil (Surviving Evil - Im Angesicht des Bösen) (2015-2018)Summerland (Summerland Beach)That's Life (2010-2011, 2014, 2016)The 100 (2016)The Ellen Show (2011)The GameThe Good WifeThe Guardian (The Guardian - Retter mit Herz) (2014)The L Word (The L Word – Wenn Frauen Frauen lieben)The Magicians (2016-present)The O.C. (O.C., California)The Originals (2014-present)The Royals (2016-present)The Secret Life of the American TeenagerThe Tudors (2011, 2014-2016)Three Rivers Medical CenterUgly BettyVampire DiariesWhat About BrianWeeds (Weeds - Kleine Deals unter Nachbarn) (2013)Will & GraceWitches of East End (2014-2016)You're the Worst (2015)

EntertainmentChopped Junior (Chopped Junior - Kleine Meisterköche) (2017-present)Flip or Flop (Top oder Flop? Die Super-Makler) (2015-present)Fixer Upper (Fixer Upper - Umbauen, einrichten, einziehen!) (2016-present)Snapped: Killer Couples (Killer Couples: Mörderische Paare) (2016-present)Wicked Attraction (Killer-Paare - Tödliches Verlangen)'' (2014–present)

Audience share

Germany

References

External links
 

Television stations in Germany
Television stations in Austria
Television stations in Switzerland
German-language television stations
Television channels and stations established in 2010
Women's interest channels
ProSiebenSat.1 Media
2010 establishments in Germany
Mass media in Munich